Pierre Bourbotte (5 June 1763, in Vault-de-Lugny – 17 June 1795, in Paris) was a French politician during the French Revolution. He was député for the Yonne to the National Convention and served as a représentant en mission, but was later guillotined.

Sources
Adolphe Robert, Gaston Cougny, Dictionnaire des parlementaires français de 1789 à 1889, Paris, Edgar Bourloton, 1889–1891, tome 1, (de Bourbeau à Bourée), p. 431-432.
Françoise Brunel, Sylvain Goujon, Les Martyrs de prairial: textes et documents inédits, Georg, 1992, 478 pages.
Charles Moiset, Bourbotte & Marceau, Constitution, 1899, 400 pages.
Abbé Alexandre Parat, « Le conventionnel Bourbotte de Vault-de-Lugny », Bulletin de la Société d'Études d'Avallon, 1921, p. 27-92.
Alois Schumacher, Idéologie révolutionnaire et pratique politique de la France en Rhénanie de 1794 à 1801, Besançon, Presses Universitaires Franche-Comté, 1989, 186 pages.

1763 births
1795 deaths
French people executed by guillotine during the French Revolution
Deputies to the French National Convention
Regicides of Louis XVI
Republican military leaders of the War in the Vendée
Représentants en mission